Charles Penrose may refer to:

 Charles Penrose (entertainer) (1873–1952), English music hall and theatre performer, and radio comedian
 Charles Penrose (rower) (1816–1868), English rower, schoolteacher and clergyman
 Charles Penrose (Royal Navy officer) (1759–1830)
 Charles B. Penrose (1798–1857), Pennsylvania attorney and politician
 Charles Bingham Penrose (1862–1925), Philadelphia gynecologist and grandson of Charles B. Penrose
 Charles W. Penrose (1832–1925), member of the Quorum of the Twelve Apostles of The Church of Jesus Christ of Latter-day Saints